The 1999 World Horticultural Exposition (昆明世博会) was an A1 category international horticultural exposition recognised by the Bureau International des Expositions (BIE). Organised under the auspices of the International Association of Horticultural Producers, the event was held in Kunming, China. The theme of the exposition was "Man and Nature, marching into the 21st century."

The event lasted from April 30 to October 31, 1999, and attracted 9.5 million visitors.

See also
World Horti-Expo Garden
History of Shanghai expo

References

External links
 A Brief Introduction to 1999 Kunming International Horticultural Exposition
 Official website of the BIE

World Horticultural Exposition
Kunming
World's fairs in China
International horticultural exhibitions
Garden festivals in China